Oil Spill Eater II is a biocatalytic system of preformed multi-enzyme liquid concentrate.  When combined with fresh or salt water and oxygen, it will cause crude oil and other organic substances to rapidly decompose, eventually biodegrading them to carbon dioxide and water.

Introduction
Oil Spill Eater II is a bioremediation process for the mitigation of hazardous waste, spills and contamination. It uses bioremediation processes that eliminate hazardous materials. It is a biological enzyme that converts the oil spills into a natural food source for the native bacteria found in the environment. The result of this process is the enzyme eater. The enzyme permanently eliminates the hazardous waste problem, with no secondary clean-up required. [1]

How It Works 
Oil spill eater II contains the biosurfactants, nutrients, and other constituents for complete life cycles and biodegradation. When Oil spill Eater II is added to a spill, the process generally takes a few minutes to several minutes, depending on how heavy the damage is. As the biosurfactants do their job, the enzymes attach themselves to broken down hydrocarbon structures, forming digestive binding sites.

Results
  The toxicity of the spill is rapidly diminished.
  The odour or smell is almost non-existent.
  The oil or spill will no longer adhere to anything.
  The spill is caused to float.[2]

Oil Spill Eater II causes the oil to come onto the surface of the water, which reduces the impact to the sub-surface. It starts to prevent secondary contamination of the water column or tertiary contamination on the body of water associated with the spill area.[2]

Economy
The product can reduce costs on cleaning up of spills quite substantially.

Health factors
The product is non-toxic to humans, animals, plants and marine life. It contains no known allergens to cause skin, respiratory or other allergic reactions. It contains no corrosive chemicals or metal trace elements, which will not damage any electrical insulation or painted surfaces. [5]

References

External links 
 Company website
 OSE II listed on the United States Environmental Protection Agency NCP List
 

Oil spill remediation technologies